Ferdinand Fellner (Frankfurt, 1799) was a German painter, illustrator and graphic artist. After receiving a high-class education he went to Munich to study art, and remained there from 1825 to 1831, but later on he established himself at Stuttgart and published a number of illustrations. As a painter his works are less meritorious. He died at Stuttgart in 1859. Some of the most remarkable of his designs for books are:

The illustrations of The Seven Swabians.
Sixteen illustrations of Don Quixote.
The illustrations of Faust.
Five illustrations of Wilhelm Tell.
Illustrations of Wallenstein, The Maid of Orleans, Macbeth, Romeo and Juliet, Burger's Lenore, Oberon, Robert, Gudrun, &c.

Among his paintings are the following:

Burgberg. Church. The Holy Family (partly painted by Pilgram).
Frankfort. Emperor's Saloon. Conrad I and Frederic the Beautiful.

See also
 List of German painters

References
 

1799 births
1859 deaths
19th-century German painters
19th-century German male artists
German male painters
German illustrators
Artists from Frankfurt